Plestiodon gilberti, commonly known as Gilbert's skink, is a species of heavy-bodied medium-sized lizard in the family Scincidae.

Taxonomy
Plestiodon gilberti was first described by Van Denburgh in 1896. It was named in honor of Van Denburgh's teacher, American ichthyologist Dr. Charles H. Gilbert (1859 - 1928), who at the time was a professor of zoology at Stanford University.

Together with the western skink (P. skiltonianus), the San Lucan skink (P. lagunensis), and the four-lined Asiatic skink (P. quadrilineatus), Gilbert's skink belongs to the so-called "skiltonianus group". The exact taxonomy within this group is being questioned and may need revision following DNA analysis research.

Subspecies
There are five subspecies of Plestiodon gilberti, including the nominotypical subspecies.
Plestiodon gilberti arizonensis  – Arizona skink
Plestiodon gilberti gilberti  – greater brown skink
Plestiodon gilberti placerensis  – northern brown skink
Plestiodon gilberti cancellosus  – variegated skink
Plestiodon gilberti rubricaudatus  – western red-tailed skink

Nota bene: A trinomial authority in parentheses indicates that the subspecies was originally described in a genus other than Plestiodon.

The subspecies P. g. placerensis is named after Placer County, California, where it occurs.

Geographic range
Gilbert's skink occurs mainly in California. It is found in the northern San Joaquin Valley, in the foothills of the Sierra Nevada from Butte County southward, and along the inner flanks of the Coast Ranges from San Francisco Bay to the Mexican border and into northern Baja California. It is also found in the mountains of southern California, and at scattered mountain localities in the eastern desert from Mono County to San Bernardino County. Isolated populations also occur in western Arizona as well as in southern Nevada.

Habitat
Found in a wide variety of habitats, this lizard is commonest in early successional stages or open areas within habitats in which it occurs, which range from grassland to open chaparral or open pine forests. Heavy brush and densely forested areas are generally avoided.

Description

Gilbert's skink is a heavy-bodied lizard with small legs. Adults are uniformly colored in green, grey, olive or brown. Juveniles have light stripes on the sides and the back enclosing a broad black or brown stripe. This dark stripe stops near base of a waxy-pink tail. The striping fades with growth and maturation.

Behavior
A robust skink, P. gilberti is seldom seen in the open. It forages through leaf litter and dense vegetation, occasionally digging through loose soil. It is a good burrower and often constructs its own shelter by burrowing under surface objects such as rocks or rotting logs.

Reproduction
The reproductive season for P. gilberti varies geographically and from year to year depending on local conditions. Little is known about the timing of reproduction, but it is probably similar to the Western Skink. Adult females construct nest chambers in loose moist soil several centimeters deep, especially under flat stones. Clutch size varies from 3 to 9 eggs.

See also
Broad-headed skink - similar morphology

References

Further reading
Behler, John L.; King, F. Wayne (1979). The Audubon Society Field Guide to North American Reptiles and Amphibians. New York: Alfred A. Knopf. 743 pp. . (Eumeces gilberti, pp. 571–572 + Plates 430, 434).
Smith, Hobart M.; Brodie, Edmund D., Jr. (1982). Reptiles of North America: A Guide to Field Identification. New York: Golden Press. 240 pp. . (Eumeces gilberti, pp. 78–79).
Stebbins RC (2003). A Field Guide to Western Reptiles and Amphibians, Third Edition. The Peterson Field Guide Series ®. Boston and New York:Houghton Mifflin. xiii + 533 pp. . (Eumeces gilberti, pp. 314–315 + Plate 36 + Map 108).
Vandenburgh J (1896). "Description of a New Lizard (Eumeces gilberti ) from the Sierra Nevada of California". Proc. California Acad. Sci., Second Series 6: 350-352.

External links

Gilbert's Skink at the U.S. Geological Survey.
Gilbert's Skink at the California Department of Fish and Game.

gilberti
Skink
Skink
Reptiles described in 1896
Taxa named by John Van Denburgh